Mansfield Park is an 1814 novel by Jane Austen.

Mansfield Park may also refer to:

Adaptations of the novel 
 Mansfield Park (1983 TV serial), a UK TV series, starring Sylvestra Le Touzel
 Mansfield Park (1999 film), a British film, starring Frances O'Connor
 Mansfield Park (2007 film), a UK TV film, starring Billie Piper
 Mansfield Park (opera), a 2011 chamber opera by Jonathan Dove and Alasdair Middleton

Places 
 Mansfield Park, Hawick, a rugby union ground in Hawick, Scotland
 Mansfield Park, South Australia, a suburb of Adelaide 
 Mansfield Club Grounds or Mansfield Park, a former baseball field in Middletown, Connecticut, USA